Conogethes ersealis is a moth in the family Crambidae. It was described by Francis Walker in 1859. It is found in Australia, where it has been recorded from Queensland.

Adults are pale yellow with black dots.

References

Moths described in 1859
Spilomelinae